Return Home is a 1990 Australian drama film directed by Ray Argall. Argall won the AFI Award for Best Director in 1990 and Frankie J. Holden was nominated for Best Actor in a Lead Role.

The story
Noel McKenzie is a successful but divorced insurance broker in Melbourne. He returns briefly to hometown Adelaide where his brother Steve operates a traditional service station and workshop. Steve has a happy family life but is struggling to compete with more modern servos with convenience store and self-service bowsers. Gary, Steve's young apprentice, needs to apologise to his girlfriend Wendy.

Cast
Dennis Coard as Noel
Frankie J. Holden as Steve
Ben Mendelsohn as Gary
Mickey Camilleri as Judy
Rachel Rains as Wendy
Gypsy Lukewood as Clare
Ryan Rawlings as Wally
Paul Nestor as Brian
Alan Fletcher as Barry
Joe Camilleri appears as a busking friend of Noel.

Production
The film was funded by the Australian Film Commission and Film Victoria with no private investment. It was shot in Adelaide over six weeks in February–March 1989 on 16mm but the AFC agreed to blow it up to 35mm.

Argall and the cast rehearsed for four weeks prior to filming. He said he worked on the script for seven years prior to the shoot.

Box office
Return Home grossed $236,252 at the box office in Australia.

See also
Cinema of Australia

References

Further reading

External links

Return Home at the Australian screen
Return Home at Oz Movies
DVD review

1990 films
Films shot in Adelaide
Australian drama films
Films shot in Melbourne
1990 drama films
1990s English-language films
1990s Australian films